The marine waters of the Houtman Abrolhos, an island chain off the coast of Western Australia, have been recorded as containing 194 species of coral in 50 genera. This is a surprisingly high coral diversity, considering the high latitude of the reef, and the relatively low diversity of other biota. This is a list of corals of the Houtman Abrolhos:



Hermatypic coral
184 species in 42 genera of hermatypic corals have been recorded from the Houtman Abrolhos:

Ahermatypic coral
In addition to the hermatypic corals, the Houtman Abrolhos contains ten species in eight genera of ahermatypic coral.

References

Further reading
 

Houtman Abrolhos, List of corals
Corals of the Houtman Abrolhos
Lists of fauna of the Houtman Abrolhos